"His Eye Is on the Sparrow" is a gospel hymn written in 1905 by lyricist Civilla D. Martin and composer Charles H. Gabriel. It is most associated with actress-singer Ethel Waters who used the title for her autobiography. Mahalia Jackson's recording of the song was honored with the Grammy Hall of Fame Award in 2010. Whitney Houston's recording of the song, one of the singer's last to be recorded before her death in 2012, was released off the soundtrack of the film, Sparkle, and became a posthumous number one Billboard single off one of the gospel singles charts.

Sometimes it was sung with the slightly altered title "His Eye is on the Tiny Bird" and this version was recorded by actress Violet Carson in 1972.

Inspiration
The theme of the song is inspired by the words of David in the Psalms and  Jesus in the Gospel of Matthew in the Bible: "I will instruct thee and teach thee in the way which thou shalt go: I will guide thee with mine eye" (Psalm 32:8). "Look at the birds of the air; they neither sow nor reap nor gather into barns, and yet your heavenly Father feeds them. Are you not of more value than they?" (Matthew 6:26) and "Are not two sparrows sold for a farthing? and one of them shall not fall on the ground without your Father. But the very hairs of your head are all numbered. Fear ye not therefore, ye are of more value than many sparrows" (Matthew 10:29–31).

Civilla Martin, who wrote the lyrics, said of her inspiration to write the song based on the scriptures:

Later published arrangements
There are many arrangements of the hymn that have been produced since its original publication. These include:
1963: in The Reader's Digest Family Songbook of Faith and Joy
1975: in The Josh White Songbook
1986: Five American Gospel Songs for solo voice and piano by Luigi Zaninelli includes a concert arrangement of it
1999: Six Gospel Hymn Preludes has an arrangement for solo organ by Wilbur Held
2007: in Songs of Comfort and Hope: Vocal Solos for Memorial and Funeral Services

Whitney Houston version

Whitney Houston recorded a version for the soundtrack of the 2012 remake of the 1976 musical film Sparkle. RCA Records released the song as the second single from the album on June 8, 2012, four months after Houston's death. This version is Houston's last original single, and second posthumous one. The song made its debut only one day after the premiere of "Celebrate". The song became Houston's second posthumous number one single on the Billboard charts, reaching the top spot on the Billboard Gospel Digital Song Sales chart in June 2012, preceded by her original recording of "I Look to You".

Critical reception

AllMusic called it a "piano, organ, and choir" showcase for Houston, citing it as a highlight of the soundtrack although admitting "Houston sounds as commanding as one can expect from a later recording." Entertainment Weekly editor Melissa Maerz called it "a gorgeously rippling solo" with Houston "testif[ying ...] that Jesus is watching over her." Jody Rosen of Rolling Stone panned the cover, saying "Houston sings – and croaks – in a voice octaves lower than in her prime. At times the song has a ravaged magnificence, but mostly it's painful."

References

External links 

Civilla Durfee Martin 
Selected Songs by Charles H. Gabriel texts and MIDI sequences of 44 songs, including "His Eye Is on the Sparrow"
Piano version and background of His Eye Is On The Sparrow Free MP3 piano version of "His Eye Is on the Sparrow"

American Christian hymns
Gospel songs
1905 songs
2012 singles
Whitney Houston songs
Song recordings produced by R. Kelly
Metaphors referring to birds
Songs released posthumously
Pace Jubilee Singers songs
Mahalia Jackson songs
20th-century hymns
Ethel Waters songs